Chris Cavanaugh may refer to:
Christine Cavanaugh (1963–2014), voice actress
Chris Cavanaugh (swimmer) (born 1962), Olympic champion swimmer